Academus or Akademos (Ancient Greek: Ἀκάδημος), also Hekademos or Hecademus (Ἑκάδημος) was an Attic hero in Greek mythology. Academus, the place lies on the Cephissus, six stadia from Athens.

Place origins

Academus, the site was sacred to Athena, the goddess of wisdom, and other immortals; it had since the Bronze Age sheltered her religious cult, which was perhaps associated with the hero-gods, the Dioskouroi (Castor and Polydeukes), and for the hero Akademos. By classical times the name of the place had evolved into the Akademeia. It had also earlier been called Ecademia (Ἑκαδημία).

According to Plutarch, Cimon converted this, "waterless and arid spot into a well watered grove, which he provided with clear running-tracks and shady walks". Its sacred grove furnished the olive oil that was distributed as prizes in the Panathenaic Games and contained in the finely decorated Panathenaic amphorae presented to the winners.

Mythology 
Plutarch, in his biography of the Athenian king Theseus (the slayer of the Minotaur), writes that, after being widowed and reaching age 50, the king abducted the 12-year-old child Helen (long before she married Menelaus, met Paris and was the cause of the Trojan War). Due to this outrage, her twin brothers Castor and Pollux invaded Attica to liberate their sister and threatened to destroy Athens. Academus spared the city by telling them where she was hidden, at Aphidnae. Also for this reason Tyndareus (a Spartan king and the father of Castor and step father of Helen) showed Academus much gratitude. As noted by Plutarch: "For this reason he was honored during his life by the Tyndaridae, and often afterwards when the Lacedaemonians invaded Attica and laid waste all the country round about, they spared the Academy, for the sake of Academus."

Plato

Academe was the site of Plato's Academy and within its groves, he gave his lectures. According to Diogenes Laertius, Dion, "bought for Plato the little garden which is in the Academy". Diogenes Laertius, notes Timon of Phlius observes that there Plato "a big fish, but a sweet-voiced speaker, musical in prose as the cicada who, perched on the trees of Hecademus, pours forth a strain as delicate as a lily".

Groves of Academe
The phrase "the groves of Academe" comes from Horace's Epistles,  20 b.c.): Atque inter silvas academi quaerere verum (To seek for truth in the groves of Academe)'. John Milton, in Paradise Regained book 4, 244-245, uses the phrase: "See there the Olive Grove of Academe, Plato's retirement, where the Attic Bird Trills her thick-warbl'd notes the summer long". Mary McCarthy made the phrase the title of her satirical novel The Groves of Academe.

Notes

References 

 Lucius Mestrius Plutarchus, Lives with an English Translation by Bernadotte Perrin. Cambridge, MA. Harvard University Press. London. William Heinemann Ltd. 1914. 1. Online version at the Perseus Digital Library. Greek text available from the same website.

Greek mythological heroes
Attican characters in Greek mythology
Theseus